The Wildlife Institute of India (WII) is an autonomous natural resource service institution established in 1982 under the Ministry of Environment Forest and Climate change, Government of India.
WII carries out wildlife research in areas of study like Biodiversity, Endangered Species, Wildlife Policy, Wildlife Management, Wildlife Forensics, Spatial Modeling, Ecodevelopment, Ecotoxicology, Habitat Ecology and Climate Change. WII has a research facility which includes Forensics, Remote Sensing and GIS, Laboratory, Herbarium, and an Electronic Library. The founder director was V. B. Saharia while the first Director was Hemendra Singh Panwar who remained the director from 1985 to 1994. Trained personnel from WII have contributed in studying and protecting wildlife in India. The national tiger census or the All India Tiger Estimation, is done by WII along with NTCA and state forest departments.

The institute is based in Dehradun, India. It is located in Chandrabani, which is close to the southern forests of Dehradun. The campus is 180 acre's, from which 100 acre's is in wilderness and 80 acre's is operational facilities. It is close to Rajaji National Park. The training of the direct recruits of the India Forest Service Officers and also those who are recruited as the State Forest Officers is done here itself.

Directors
The current director of Wildlife Institute of India is Dhananjai Mohan who was appointed in December 2019.  He was formerly Principal Chief Conservator of Forests, Planning and Financial Management and Chairman of State Biodiversity Board in Uttarakhand.

Previous directors included:
 Vinod Bihari Mathur from February 2014 to (June 2019?)
 Radha Krishna Goel from 2013 to February 2014
 Priya Ranjan Sinha from September 2004 to June 2013
  Hemendra Singh Panwar from 1985 to 1994, first director of the Wildlife Institute of India.

See also
 Indian Council of Forestry Research and Education
 Laboratory for the Conservation of Endangered Species
 Forest Research Institute (India)
 Arid Forest Research Institute
 List of Environment and Forest Research Institutes in India
 Van Vigyan Kendra (VVK) Forest Science Centres

See also
 List of think tanks in India

References

External links
 Wildlife Institute of India official website
 ENVIS Centre: Wildlife & Protected Areas (Secondary Database); Wildlife Institute of India (WII)
 "Online Photo Galleries" on Nature and Wildlife of India at "India Nature Watch (INW)" - spreading the love of nature and wildlife in India through photography
 Official website of: Government of India, Ministry of Environment & Forests

Legislation from Official website of: Government of India, Ministry of Environment & Forests
  "Legislations on Environment, Forests, and Wildlife" from the Official website of: Government of India, Ministry of Environment & Forests
 "India’s Forest Conservation Legislation: Acts, Rules, Guidelines", from the Official website of: Government of India, Ministry of Environment & Forests
 Wildlife Legislations, including - "The Indian Wildlife (Protection) Act" from the Official website of: Government of India, Ministry of Environment & Forests

Research institutes in Dehradun
Universities and colleges in Uttarakhand
Wildlife conservation in India
Ministry of Environment, Forest and Climate Change
Think tanks based in India
Wildlife conservation organizations
1982 establishments in Uttar Pradesh
Nature conservation in Asia